Mount Saint Patrick College, also known as Mt Saint Patrick College, is an independent Roman Catholic co-educational secondary day school, located in Murwillumbah, New South Wales, Australia, operating within the system administered by the Lismore Catholic Education Office, a subsidiary of the Roman Catholic Diocese of Lismore.

History 
Mt St Patrick caters to students in Year 7 to Year 12. It was opened in 1926 by the Presentation Sisters and was administered and staffed by them until 1989. It derives its name from St Patrick, the patron saint of Ireland, whose feast day is celebrated by both the College and local communities. In 1966, following the closure of other local Catholic secondary schools, the school became known as Mt St Patrick Regional High School, with 192 enrolled students. The appointment of the school's first lay Principal in 1990 ended 64 years of leadership by the Presentation Sisters, leading to the renaming of the school in 1998 to Mt St Patrick College. In 2011 the Australian Government's Economic Stimulus Package enabled the opening of the St Mary of the Cross Science and Language Centre. A record enrolment of 695 students was recorded in 2012. On 15 March 2013, the Gilbey Multipurpose Centre was officially opened, costing $6,230,256.

Houses 
Students are divided into four houses. Each house is named after a person or place significant to the college and its establishment. The houses are; Lucan (Green), Nagle (Gold), Loreto (Blue) and Lisieux (Red) (The four houses are soon to be split into eight). The houses compete for the St Patrick's Champion House Trophy which is presented to the winning house on St Patrick's Day every year. The winning house is determined by the accumulated points each house receives through sporting and academic achievements of each of its students.

Notable alumni 

 Luke Covell, a former rugby league football player, in the NRL and New Zealand international codes
 PJ Hogan, an Australian film director
 Anthony Laffranchi, a former rugby league football player, in the NRL, Super League and Italian international codes
 Damien Quinn, a former rugby league football player, in the NRL, Super League code
 Kate Wilson, an Australian Paralympic swimmer
 Ally Burnham, author and screenwriter, winner of 2022 AWGIE Awards for animation

See also

 Catholic education in Australia
 List of non-government schools in New South Wales
 List of schools in Northern Rivers and Mid North Coast

References

External links 
 Official Mt St Patrick's College Website

1926 establishments in Australia
Educational institutions established in 1926
Presentation Sisters schools
Catholic secondary schools in New South Wales
Education in Tweed Heads, New South Wales